Cerâmica Atlético Clube, usually known as simply as Cerâmica, is a Brazilian football club from Gravataí, Rio Grande do Sul state, founded by the workers of the Ceramic of Gravataí. They competed in the Série D once.

History
On April 19, 1950, Cerâmica Atlético Clube was founded by employees of the Ceramic of Gravataí.

The club ensured the promotion to the first division of the state on July 6, 2011.

Achievements
Copa FGF

Runners-up (2): 2008, 2010

Recopa Sul-Brasileira: 1
2010

References

External links
 Cerâmica Atlético Clube official website
 Juice, Cookie and Barbecue, the new players of Cerâmica.

Association football clubs established in 1950
Football clubs in Rio Grande do Sul
1950 establishments in Brazil